Our Moon has Blood Clots : The Exodus of the Kashmiri Pandits is a 2013 memoir by Indian author Rahul Pandita about the exodus of Kashmiri Hindus in the late 1989 and early 1990.

Reception
Manjula Narayan of Hindustan Times wrote: "The form contributes to much of the power of this book that speaks of the pain of fleeing a beloved home, incorporates moving descriptions of rituals specific to the Shaivite Pandits, and weaves in oral histories and snatches of poetry from, among others, Lal Ded and Agha Shahid Ali". Soutik Biswas of Mint gave a positive review and said, "Pandita writes evocatively about passing trucks filled with scared Pandits escaping to Jammu, the women “herded like cattle”, and a man showing the family his fist and wishing them death." He however felt that journalism was the "weakest link in what is a largely engaging memoir."

Amberish K Diwanji of Daily News and Analysis wrote that the book "Our Moon Has Blood Clots makes for difficult reading. Not only did the refugees suffer from government neglect, even their religious kindred in Jammu cared little for them and exploited them. Entire families, with five or six members, were put up in small rooms. There was no privacy, rents were exorbitant and water was rationed."

References

Further reading 
 Anuradha Bhasin Jamwal, A Moon has Many Shades, Economic and Political Weekly, 27 April 2013.
 Rahul Pandita, Selective Memory, Collective Amnesia, Economic and Political Weekly, 1 June 2013.
 Sualeh Keen, Inconvenient People, Economic and Political Weekly, 8 June 2013.
 Bashir Manzir, Kashmir: A Tale of Two Communities, Cloven, Economic and Political Weekly, 27 July 2013.
 D. P. Satish, Book review: Our Moon Has Blood Clots, Gateway House, 1 February 2013.
 Prayaag Akbar, A partial but important depiction of loss and exile, The Sunday Guardian, 7 February 2013.
 Pradeep Magazine, From the Valley, a selective remembrance of things past, The Hindu, 8 February 2013.
 Amberish K. Dewanji, Book Review: 'Our Moon Has Blood Clots: The exodus of the Kashmiri Pandits', Daily News and Analysis, 10 February 2013.
 Peter Griffin, Rahul Pandita On Kashmir and its Stories, Forbes India, 8 March 2013.
 K. S. Narayanan, Book Review: Our Moon Has Blood Clots, The Sunday Indian, 14 March 2013.
 Nandini Krishnan, Rahul Pandita, Basharat Peer and Kashmir's contradictory stories, SIFY News, 25 April 2013.

External links
 Official website
Just Books: Rahul Pandita on 'Our Moon Has Blood Clots', NDTV

Books about the Kashmir conflict
Indian memoirs
2013 non-fiction books